Charles E. Sample (January 5, 1920 – May 15, 2001) was a player in the National Football League for the Green Bay Packers in 1942 and 1945 as a fullback. He played at the collegiate level at the University of Toledo.

Biography
Sample was born Charles Sample on January 5, 1920 in Green Bay, Wisconsin.

See also
Green Bay Packers players

References

External links
      

Green Bay Packers players
Players of American football from Wisconsin
Sportspeople from Green Bay, Wisconsin
2001 deaths
1920 births
Toledo Rockets football players